Lokikere  is a village in the southern state of Karnataka, India. It is in the Davanagere taluk of Davanagere district.

Demographics
 India census, Lokikere had a population of 5805 with 2971 males and 2834 females. Lokikere is famous for the agriculture; the people grow rice, sugarcane, etc. Lokikere also has a Hanuman temple, which is said to be the protector of the village.

See also
 Districts of Karnataka

References

External links
 http://Davanagere.nic.in/

Villages in Davanagere district